Malcolm John McBean (4 October 1921 – 26 June 2013) was an Australian rules footballer who played with Footscray and St Kilda in the Victorian Football League (VFL).

Notes

External links 		
		
		
		
		
		
		
		
1921 births		
2013 deaths		
Australian rules footballers from Melbourne
Western Bulldogs players		
St Kilda Football Club players
West Footscray Football Club players
People from Footscray, Victoria